Clayton Iona "Clay" Stanley (born January 20, 1978) is an American volleyball player, a member of United States men's national volleyball team, a participant of the Olympic Games (Athens 2004, Beijing 2008, London 2012), Olympic Champion 2008, NORCECA Champion 2005, multimedalist of the World League.

In October 2021, he will be inducted into the International Volleyball Hall of Fame, along with Logan Tom and Todd Rogers.

Personal life
Stanley was born in Honolulu, Hawaii, to Jon Stanley and Sandra Haine. He has three brothers (Reese Haine, Wil Stanley and Jon Stanley), and two sisters (Taeya Stanley and Natasha Haine). His parents and grandfather Tom Haine were volleyball players. His mother and grandfather represented Canada, father Jon represented United States. Stanley's father played on 1968 Olympic Games and is a member of the Volleyball Hall of Fame. Stanley's step-grandfather, Tom Haine, was also on the 1968 men's Olympic volleyball team. His mother, Sandra Haine, played professionally for the Denver Comets as well as for Canada's national team. With Stanley's first Olympic appearance in Athens, Greece, he and his father became the first father-son Olympians in USA volleyball history.

In July 2013 he married Kristin (née Jackson). In March 2014 they announced that they are expecting their first child.

College
Stanley is a graduate of Kaiser High School in Honolulu and did not play volleyball in high school, as the school did not have a boys' team at the time.

Stanley attended the University of Hawaii, where he majored in Spanish. Stanley was a freshman in 1997, but redshirted his sophomore year. He decided to forgo his 2000 senior redshirt year to play professionally.

In 1999, Stanley broke Hawaii's single-match kill record with 50 kills against UCLA. In 2000, he was Third-Team All-Mountain Pacific Sports Federation and ranked in the Top 15 of the nation with a 5.53 kill average. He led the MPSF in aces and tied team record with 54. He finished his career 10th on all-time kill list at Hawaii.

International
Playing at the 2004 Summer Olympics, Stanley led the team and finished fifth overall in scoring with 110 points on 83 kills, 17 aces and 10 blocks. His 17 aces ranked second among all players in the tournament. At the 2008 Summer Olympics in Beijing, China, Stanley helped Team USA to its first gold medal in 20 years. For his performances during the tournament, he was selected as the MVP, Best Scorer, and Best Server of the Olympics.

With the professional club Iraklis Thessaloniki, he won the silver medal at the 2004–05 CEV Champions League and was awarded "Best Scorer" and "Best Server". The next season he also won the silver medal and was awarded "Best Scorer".

Playing with Dynamo-Tattransgaz he won the 2007–08 Indesit Champions League and also was individually awarded "Most Valuable Player".

Stanley was one of the older members of the 2012 Olympic team that lost in the quarterfinals. Stanley picked up a knee injury in London and never again played in a major tournament for the U.S. In August 2016 he retired from professional career.

Awards

Individuals
 2012 FIVB Volleyball World League "Best Server"
 2010 FIVB World Championship "Best Server"
 2009-10 CEV Champions League League Round "Best Server"
 2008 Summer Olympics "Most Valuable Player"
 2008 Summer Olympics "Best Scorer"
 2008 Summer Olympics "Best Server"
 2007 NORCECA Volleyball Championship "Best Server"
 2007–08 CEV Champions League Final Four "Most Valuable Player"
 2005 Liga de Voleibol Superior "Dream Team"
 2005–06 CEV Champions League "Best Scorer"
 2004–05 CEV Champions League "Best Scorer"
 2004–05 CEV Champions League "Best Server" 
 2003 NORCECA Volleyball Championship "Most Valuable Player"

National team

Senior team
 2009 FIVB World Grand Champions Cup,  Bronze medal
 2008 Summer Olympics,  Gold medal
 2008 FIVB World League,  Gold medal
 2007 NORCECA Championship,  Gold medal
 2007 America's Cup,  Gold medal
 2007 FIVB World League,  Bronze medal
 2005 NORCECA Championship,  Gold medal
 2005 FIVB World Grand Champions Cup,  Silver medal

Clubs
 2007–08 CEV Indesit Champions League -   Champion, Dynamo-Tattransgaz
 2005–06 CEV Champions League -  Runner-up, with Iraklis Thessaloniki
 2004–05 CEV Champions League -  Runner-up, with Iraklis Thessaloniki

References

External links

 Clayton Stanley at the International Volleyball Federation (archive)
 
 
 
 

1978 births
Living people
Volleyball players from Honolulu
American men's volleyball players
Hawaii Rainbow Warriors volleyball players
Olympic gold medalists for the United States in volleyball
Volleyball players at the 2004 Summer Olympics
Volleyball players at the 2008 Summer Olympics
Volleyball players at the 2012 Summer Olympics
Ural Ufa volleyball players
Panathinaikos V.C. players
Iraklis V.C. players
PAOK V.C. players
Aris V.C. players
Medalists at the 2008 Summer Olympics
Opposite hitters